Alfred Massey (16 October 1918 – 24 January 2006) was an English footballer who played in the Football League for Stoke City. He also played for Congleton Town and Stafford Rangers.

Career
Massey was born in Stoke-on-Trent and played amateur football with Caversall Old Boys and Congleton Town before joining Stoke City in 1938. He played twice in 1938–39 before his career was interrupted by World War II. He later played for Stafford Rangers.

Outside of football, Massey played cricket for Staffordshire in the Minor Counties Championship between 1937 and 1949.

Career statistics

References

1918 births
2006 deaths
Footballers from Stoke-on-Trent
Association football wing halves
English footballers
Congleton Town F.C. players
Stoke City F.C. players
Stafford Rangers F.C. players
English Football League players
English cricketers
Staffordshire cricketers